Kunwar is a surname of Nepalese and Indian people belonging to Mian Rajput caste. The name Kunwar is coined to denote a young prince in South Asia region. Kunwar family is a dynasty of Nepalese Khas-Chhetri nobility of Gorkha Kingdom bearing the surname.

Notable people with surname Kunwar
Ram Krishna Kunwar, Nepalese warlord during rule of King Prithvi Narayan Shah
Ranajit Kunwar, Nepalese military commander and governor
Chandrabir Kunwar, Nepalese governor and military commander
Kunwar Nau Nihal Singh, 3rd Maharaja of Sikh Emipre
Bal Narsingh Kunwar, Nepalese military officer and courtier 
Kuwar Virk, Punjabi Rajput
 Balbhadra Kunwar; Nepalese military commander, One of the National heroes of Nepal
 Jung Bahadur Kunwar Rana; Eighth Prime Minister of Nepal and Founder of 104 years old Rana dynasty in Nepal
Bam Bahadur Kunwar, Ninth Prime Minister of Nepal
 Ranodip Singh Kunwar; Tenth Prime Minister of Nepal. Fifth Brother of Jung Bahadur
 Dhir Shamsher Kunwar Rana, Commander-in-chief of the Nepalese Army, youngest brother of Jung Bahadur 
Ramjee Kunwar, Nepalese politician
Ashutosh kunwar, Nepalese 
Kabita Kunwar, Nepalese cricketer 
Baburam Kunwar, first governor of Gandaki Province

References 

Nepali-language surnames